Systemic administration is a route of administration of medication, nutrition or other substance into the circulatory system so that the entire body is affected.  Administration can take place via enteral administration (absorption of the drug through the gastrointestinal tract) or parenteral administration (generally injection, infusion, or implantation).

Contrast with topical administration where the effect is generally local.

References

Routes of administration